Dieter Baumann (born 9 February 1965) is a former German athlete and winner of the 5000 m at the 1992 Summer Olympics. He also won the silver medal in the same event (5000 m) at the 1988 Summer Olympics. In 1999 Baumann tested positive for nandrolone and received a two-year suspension.

Biography
Born in Blaustein, Germany (then West Germany), Dieter Baumann was one of the few non-African athletes who were able to seriously challenge the African dominance of middle-distance running during the 1990s. Baumann was equally adept at both the 1,500 m and 5,000 m distances.

Although Baumann came second in the 3,000 m at the European Indoor Championships in 1987, few considered him a medal chance at the 1988 Summer Olympics. The 5,000 m final at Seoul was won by John Ngugi from Kenya who broke away from the field early in the race. However, Baumann used his superior 1,500 m speed to outsprint the rest of the field in the final lap to win the silver medal. Baumann missed most of the 1990 season due to tendon trouble, but he returned in 1991 to finish fourth in the 5,000 m at the World Championships in Tokyo. At the end of the season, Baumann unexpectedly beat the Kenyan 5,000 m world champion Yobes Ondieki over 3,000 m in Cologne.

In early 1992 Baumann narrowly missed the 3,000 m world indoor record. In June, at a meeting in Seville he set a new German record over 5,000 m (13:09.03). At the Olympics in Barcelona, the 5000 m final started at a fast pace, but then slowed, increasing Baumann's advantage due to his finishing kick. However, he got boxed in amongst four African runners in the back straight of the last lap, and was only able to get out into the clear coming into the home straight. From there, Baumann launched into a devastating sprint to pass his opponents and win the gold medal. Later that year, Baumann pre-announced a world record attempt over 3,000 m for the meeting in Cologne. However, he did not win the race as Moses Kiptanui snatched the victory away by setting a new world record.

Baumann missed the next season due to injury, but was back at the European Championships in 1994. In the 5,000 m final, Baumann was always well placed in the field, and used his trademark devastating kick to outsprint Rob Denmark of the UK in the final lap to win the gold medal. At the World Championships in Gothenburg, in the 5,000 m final, Baumann inexplicably lost contact with the leading group with three laps to go, and struggled home in a disappointing ninth place. However, a few days after the disappointment of Gothenburg, Baumann ran one of the fastest races in his career when he broke his national record (13:01.72) to come second in Zürich behind Haile Gebrselassie.

At the 1996 Olympic Games in Atlanta, Baumann would find it a difficult challenge to successfully defend his Olympic title, because the other athletes had been setting much faster times than Baumann's during 1995 and 1996 seasons. But Baumann still managed to finish in a creditable fourth place.

On his third World Championships in Athens, Baumann finished fifth in the 5,000 m. In Zürich, a few days later he became the first European runner to break the 13-minute-barrier when he finished in 12:54.70 min. 

In the next year he won a silver medal in 10,000 m at the European Championships held in Budapest. He also tried to defend his title over 5,000 m but did not even come close to winning a medal. In one of his last great races he set a new personal best over 3,000 m in Monaco in 7:30.50 min in August 1998.

On 19 October 1999 Baumann tested positive for nandrolone and received a two-year suspension, thus missing the 2000 Summer Olympics. The exact circumstances of this episode remain unclear. Baumann was voluntarily tested after the initial results by an independent institute. Extremely high levels of nandrolone continued to be found in the tests and the results of the tests fluctuated dramatically depending on which time of day Baumann was tested. After several weeks of voluntary tests, Baumann claimed that the results varied with the time of day because the nandrolone was in his toothpaste. The German Athletics Federation (DLV) reluctantly believed Baumann that someone had manipulated his toothpaste and allowed him to start at the German championships where Baumann qualified for the Olympic Games in Sydney. However, the IAAF did not agree with that verdict and imposed a ban. Baumann tried to sue the IAAF before a German court but was unsuccessful. Those defending Baumann have pointed to the fact that the levels of nandrolone found in his body were completely abnormal for any athlete wishing to enhance his performance. Baumann's opponents argued that he had no conclusive proof for his version of the story and could not name a suspect. According to Doping expert Wilhelm Schänzer the banned substance went into his involuntary. He further concluded that in former East Germany, athletes were attacked with these substances, it was an attack on him.

After the ban, he came back in 2002, at the age of 37, and won another silver medal over 10,000 m at the European Championships in Munich. Baumann participated in the 2003 World Championships in Athletics in Paris over 10,000 m but did not finish the race. He retired in late 2003.

Personal life
His daughter, Jackie Baumann, is a hurdler.

External links 
 Leverkusen who's who

References

1965 births
Living people
People from Alb-Donau-Kreis
Sportspeople from Tübingen (region)
German male long-distance runners
German male middle-distance runners
German national athletics champions
Athletes (track and field) at the 1988 Summer Olympics
Athletes (track and field) at the 1992 Summer Olympics
Athletes (track and field) at the 1996 Summer Olympics
Doping cases in athletics
German sportspeople in doping cases
Olympic silver medalists for West Germany
Olympic gold medalists for Germany
Olympic athletes of Germany
Olympic athletes of West Germany
German masters athletes
European Athletics Championships medalists
World Athletics Championships athletes for Germany
Medalists at the 1992 Summer Olympics
Medalists at the 1988 Summer Olympics
Olympic gold medalists in athletics (track and field)
Olympic silver medalists in athletics (track and field)
World Athletics Indoor Championships medalists
Recipients of the Order of Merit of Baden-Württemberg